The Sobibor perpetrator album contains sixty-two pictures of Sobibor extermination camp during its operation, taken by the SS Holocaust perpetrators employed there. It belonged to deputy commander Johann Niemann, who was killed in the Sobibor uprising in 1943. The album was donated to the United States Holocaust Memorial Museum in 2020 and is the first collection of photographs of the camp in operation to be published.

The USHMM states that it "has not been able to identify the copyright status of this material".

References

Further reading

Sobibor extermination camp
Holocaust photographs
1940s photographs